Guzan may refer to:
Guzan, Iran
 Brad Guzan, footballer